Ashram Public School (Telugu: ఆశ్రమ్ పబ్లిక్ స్కూల్) is a co-educational, English medium school in Kakinada, East Godavari district in the Indian state of Andhra Pradesh. It was founded in 1987 by a service-oriented private trust, Vishnu Sevashram and Yogashram. The trust is a non-profit organization that owns 38 acres of land with the objectives of propagating gurukulam (education), yoga and Ayurveda. The school includes a 5 hectares mango grove that provides a spot of greenery in the midst of a concrete jungle. The school opened in June 1987.

Vision
The school aims transform students into respectable citizens imbued with principles, culture and refinement. The objectives of Ashram Public School is to provide an educational environment conductive to the intellectual, emotional and physical growth of its students.

Academics and admissions 
Ashram Public School, which is affiliated to the Central Board of Secondary Education, Delhi, offers education right down from kindergarten to Class 12. The academic session in the school usually starts from April 1 and closes on March 31, the next year. Admissions usually open in April and close by June.

Infrastructure

Classrooms 
Two buildings house most of the classrooms - the beginner block near the school's main entrance, and the Tapaswiji Block near the side entrance. The Beginner's block houses classrooms of class 1 to 5 students, while the Tapswiji Block houses Classes 6 to 12's classrooms.

Library 
The school's official website says that the library has about 12000 books in total in three languages, Hindi, Telugu and English.

References

International schools in India